Habovka is a village and municipality in Tvrdošín District in the Žilina Region of northern Slovakia.

History
In historical records the village was first mentioned in 1593. The first settlers came from the Polish village of Chabówka, which lent the settlement its name.

Geography
The municipality lies at an altitude of 730 metres and covers an area of 29.414 km². It has a population of about 1,350 people.

Genealogical resources

The records for genealogical research are available at the state archive "Statny Archiv in Bytca, Slovakia"

 Greek Catholic church records (births/marriages/deaths): 1787-1897 (parish A)

See also
 List of municipalities and towns in Slovakia

References

External links
 Official Habovka website
Surnames of living people in Habovka

Villages and municipalities in Tvrdošín District